When Lights Are Low is a 2005 studio album by Claire Martin and Richard Rodney Bennett.

Track listing

References 

2005 albums
Claire Martin (singer) albums
Richard Rodney Bennett albums
Linn Records albums